Pete McTee's Clubhouse was a Saturday morning television series that originally aired from September 15, 1990 until 2004 on WPMT Fox-43 in York, Pennsylvania. The show starred Pete McTee (Lou Castriota, Sr.) and featured an ensemble cast including Professor Noodles (Tom Ensminger), Captain Cool (Don Schaller, 1990-2001; Michael Ovadia, 2001–2003), Dee (actress name unknown), and Sammi Jo (Lesli Morrison). Other characters on the show included Pete's dog Wembley, and his computer Scooter. Overall, 404 episodes were produced. The show was unique in that it was never scripted. Castriota and Ensminger would meet a few days before taping (which usually occurred on Tuesdays) to rough out the shows segments. 

The show was filmed before a live studio audience, usually consisting of Boy Scouts troops, Girl Scouts troops, or other groups of children from the area. Each episode featured several segments, typically including an educational segment about science and a segment with a cartoon shown on Scooter's screen (such as The Rocky and Bullwinkle Show).

During the later years, the show would air Sunday mornings.  Most of these are believed to be reruns.

The show was originally created by Castriota, a programming director at WPMT at the time, in response to the Children's Television Act, which required TV stations to air at least three hours of educational children's programming every week. Castriota gave the role of Professor Noodles, who served as Pete's co-host on the show, to Tom Ensminger, whom he had known since High School.

The series won the Pennsylvania Association of Broadcasters award for best locally produced children's show in 1991, 1992, 1993, 1994, 1996, 1997, 1999, and 2000.

Between 1993 ND the late 1990s, small segments were aired before and after cartoons shown in the early hours of the weekday, typically before school.  These segments were called "PeteTV".  A word-changed cover of Dire Straits' song "Money for Nothing" had been used, but slightly altered for the theme.  Instead of "I Want My MTV"; they spoke "I Want My PeteTV".  (Note)  These segments were NOT recorded in front of an audience.  They were either done live ... or pre-recorded to air in this method.

In 2005, Lou Castriota and Tom Ensminger purchased the show from WPMT. Soon after, the cast began reuniting as the Pete McTee’s Big Red Nose Tour to perform annual live shows at Strand Capital in York, Pennsylvania in 2007 and 2008. The shows benefited Leg Up Farm, a non-profit organization founded by Castriota's son, Lou Castriota, Jr.

A re-mixed version of the show started airing in 2009 on WGCB-TV, Family 49, in Red Lion, Pennsylvania.

The show still airs as reruns on WPMT Saturday mornings at 6:30 AM EST.

References 

1990s American children's television series
2000s American children's television series
1990 American television series debuts
2004 American television series endings
American children's education television series
American television series with live action and animation
Local children's television programming in the United States